Isaia is a given name and surname. Notable people with the name include:

People with the given name
Isaia Cordinier (born 1996), French basketball player
Isaia Gonewai, Fijian politician
Isaia Italeli (1960s –2011), Tuvaluan politician
Isaia Rasila (1969–2010), Fijian rugby union player
Isaia Toeava (born 1986), New Zealand rugby union player

People with the surname
Sale Isaia (born 1972), former American football player
Lino Isaia, politician from Tokelau

See also
Isaia, Italian menswear brand
Isaiah (given name)
Isaias (given name)